Laila Kamilia is a novelist and blogger from Malaysia. Her real name is Haslina Kamaluddin, and she was born in Teluk Intan, Perak in 1977. Her first appearance as a novelist was in 2006 under her real name. She wrote Asmara Asrama, under the publisher, Creative Enterprise Sdn Bhd. In 2007, she joined Alaf21 Sdn Bhd (subsidiary company of Karangkraf Berhad). With Alaf 21,she has written seven novels under the name Laila Kamilia.  The first Lakaran Kasih, was published in 2007. Her second, Saat kau hadir, was published in 2008. Her third novel Cinta Pandang Ke-2 was a successful hit and sold more than 50,000 copies. The novel also has been adapted to a 13 episode drama with the same title produced by ZK Creative and screened by TV9.

Bibliography

References

External links
  Laila Kamilia's blog

1977 births
Malaysian people of Malay descent
Living people
Malaysian writers